Harrison House  was a historic building in Centerville, Pennsylvania. It was built c. 1845 as a Post Colonial Greek Revival house, and later updated to a High Victorian Italianate style. The five-bay -story structure with a two-story bay window unit with a turret roof and a four-story tower was unusual for the Washington County, Pennsylvania area.

It is designated as a historic residential landmark/farmstead by the Washington County History & Landmarks Foundation, and is listed on the National Register of Historic Places.  Satellite images show that the house no longer exists.

References

Houses on the National Register of Historic Places in Pennsylvania
Italianate architecture in Pennsylvania
Houses completed in 1845
Houses in Washington County, Pennsylvania
National Register of Historic Places in Washington County, Pennsylvania